Janak Ram is an Indian politician and former member of parliament from the Lok Sabha constituency of Gopalganj. He won the 2014 Indian general election as a Bharatiya Janata Party candidate. He currently serves as Minister of Mines & Geology (Government of Bihar).

Personal life 
He is married to Kumari Priyanka and has 1 son, and a daughter.

References

India MPs 2014–2019
Lok Sabha members from Bihar
Bharatiya Janata Party politicians from Bihar
People from Gopalganj district, India
Living people
1973 births